Labastide-Saint-Sernin is a commune in the Haute-Garonne department in southwestern France.

Population

The inhabitants of the commune are known as Labastidiens and Labastidiennes.

Sights

See also
 Communes of the Haute-Garonne department

References

Communes of Haute-Garonne